Per Gjersøe (13 October 1908 – 6 November 1980) was a Norwegian actor, stage instructor and film director.

He was born in Tønsberg. He made his stage debut at Nationaltheatret in 1938. From 1945 to 1950 he was assigned at Studioteatret, and later at Det nye Teater, Riksteatret, Fjernsynsteatret, Teatret Vårt in Molde, and at Den Nationale Scene in Bergen. His first independent stage production was an adaptation of Arthur Koestler's play Twilight Bar in 1946, and in 1947 he staged Ingmar Bergman's play Hets. In 1962 he co-directed the film Tonny, based on Jens Bjørneboe's novel Den onde hyrde, in cooperation with Nils R. Müller. He was among the co-founders of the regional theatre for Møre og Romsdal, Teatret Vårt, in 1972.

External links

References 

1908 births
1980 deaths
People from Tønsberg
Norwegian male stage actors
20th-century Norwegian male actors